Pascal Lavergne (born 28 August 1967) is a French politician from En Marche. He was Member of Parliament for Gironde's 12th constituency from 2018 to 2020. He was elected to a full term in the 2022 French legislative election.

References 

Living people
1967 births
People from Limoges

La République En Marche! politicians
Socialist Party (France) politicians
21st-century French politicians
Deputies of the 15th National Assembly of the French Fifth Republic
Deputies of the 16th National Assembly of the French Fifth Republic